Castle Valley may refer to the following places in the United States:

Communities
 Castle Valley, Pennsylvania, former community that is now part of Doylestown, Pennsylvania
 Castle Valley, Utah

Valleys
 Castle Valley (California), within Tahoe National Forest, Nevada County, California
 Castle Valley (Carbon, Emery, and Sevier counties, Utah), a valley in Utah
 Castle Valley (Grand County, Utah), a valley in Utah
 Castle Valley (Iron County, Utah), a valley in Utah